Yachting is a monthly English-language magazine published since 1907. It was founded by Oswald Garrison Villard, publisher of the New York Evening Post and The Nation.

Early history
On January 1, 1907, publisher Oswald Garrison Villard released the first issue of Yachting.  A year later he appointed his “schoolmate and lifelong friend”, 37-year-old Herbert L. Stone, as the magazine's second editor.  Stone continued as the editor through a series of ownership changes, except for a brief period during World War I when Stone went to war and Wililam Atkin took over.

In 1920 Herbert Stone, Albert Britt and William A. Miles purchased the magazine from Mr. Villard, and sold it to John Clarke Kennedy a few years later.  In 1938 Stone and some friends assembled the Yachting Publishing Company, and took on the role of president, publisher, and editor. He served as editor until his retirement in 1952, and remained as publisher and president of the corporation until his death in 1955.

Content
Yachting features articles on sailing and powerboating. Most of the editorial content covers new marine products and developments, a calendar of races and lists of yacht brokerages.

The magazine is published by Bonnier Corporation. The editorial offices are in New York, NY, USA.

Publishers

References
Notes

Bibliography

 Bonnier Corporation.
 . (Subscription required).

External links
 Yachting
 Yachting at the HathiTrust

Sailing magazines
Magazines established in 1907
Sports magazines published in the United States
Bonnier Group
Magazines published in New York City